Cumbrian dialect or Cumberland dialect is a local dialect of Northern England in decline, spoken in Cumberland, Westmorland and Lancashire North of the Sands.  Sounding simlilar & not to be confused with the area's extinct Celtic language, Cumbric. Some parts of Cumbria have a more North-East English sound to them. Whilst clearly spoken with a Northern English accent.  The Cumbrian dialect shares much vocabulary with Scots. A Cumbrian Dictionary of Dialect, Tradition and Folklore by William Rollinson exists, as well as a more contemporary and lighthearted Cumbrian Dictionary and Phrase Book.

History of Cumbrian language

Northumbrian origin
As with other English dialects north of the Humber-Lune Line and the closely-related Scots language, Cumbrian is descent from Northern Middle English and in turn Northumbrian Old English. Old English was introduced to Cumbria from Northumbria where it was initially spoken alongside the native Cumbric language.

Celtic influence

Despite the modern county being created only in 1974 from the counties of Cumberland, Westmorland and north Lancashire and parts of Yorkshire, Cumbria is an ancient division.  Before the arrival of the Romans the area was the home of the Carvetii tribe, which was later assimilated to the larger Brigantes tribe.  These people would have spoken Brythonic, which developed into Old Welsh, but around the 5th century AD, when Cumbria was the centre of the kingdom of Rheged, the language spoken in northern England and southern Scotland from Lancashire and Yorkshire to Strathclyde had developed into a dialect of Brythonic known as Cumbric (the scarcity of linguistic evidence, however, means that Cumbric's distinctness from Old Welsh is more deduced than proven).  Remnants of Brythonic and Cumbric are most often seen in place names, in elements such as caer 'fort' as in Carlisle, pen 'hill' as in Penrith and craig 'crag, rock' as in High Crag.

The most well known Celtic element in Cumbrian dialect is the sheep counting numerals which are still used in various forms by shepherds throughout the area, and apparently for knitting. The word 'Yan' (meaning 'one'), for example, is prevalent throughout Cumbria and is still often used, especially by non-speakers of 'received pronunciation' and children, e.g. "That yan owr there," or "Can I have yan of those?"

The Northern subject rule may be attributable to Celtic Influence.

Before the 8th century AD Cumbria was annexed to English Northumbria and Old English began to be spoken in parts, although evidence suggests Cumbric survived in central regions in some form until the 11th century.

Norse influence
A far stronger influence on the modern dialect was Old Norse, spoken by Norwegian settlers who probably arrived in Cumbria in the 10th century via Ireland and the Isle of Man.  The majority of Cumbrian place names are of Norse origin, including Ulverston from Ulfrs tun ('Ulfr's farmstead'), Kendal from Kent dalr ('valley of the River Kent') and Elterwater from eltr vatn ('swan lake').  Many of the traditional dialect words are also remnants of Norse settlement, including beck (bekkr, 'stream'), laik (leik, 'to play'), lowp (hlaupa, 'to jump') and glisky (gliskr, 'shimmering').

Old Norse seems to have survived in Cumbria until fairly late.  A 12th-century inscription found at Loppergarth in Furness bears a curious mixture of Old English and Norse, showing that the language was still felt in the south of the county at this time, and would probably have hung on in the fells and dales (both Norse words) until later.

Once Cumbrians had assimilated to speaking English, there were few further influences on the dialect.  In the Middle Ages, much of Cumbria frequently swapped hands between England and Scotland but this had little effect on the language used.  In the nineteenth century miners from Cornwall and Wales began relocating to Cumbria to take advantage of the work offered by new iron ore, copper and wadd mines but whilst they seem to have affected some local accents (notably Barrow-in-Furness) they don't seem to have contributed much to the vocabulary.

The earliest recordings of the dialect were in a book published by Agnes Wheeler in 1790. The Westmoreland dialect in three familiar dialogues, in which an attempt is made to illustrate the provincial idiom. There were four editions of the book. Her work was later used in Specimens of the Westmorland Dialect published by the Revd Thomas Clarke in 1887.

One of the lasting characteristics still found in the local dialect of Cumbria today is an inclination to drop vowels, especially in relation to the word "the" which is frequently abbreviated.  Unlike the Lancashire dialect, where 'the' is abbreviated to 'th', in Cumbrian (as in Yorkshire) the sound is harder like the letter '?' or simply a 't' and in sentences sounds as if it is attached to the previous word, for example "int" instead of "in the" "ont" instead of "on the".

Accent and pronunciation 

Cumbria is a large area with several relatively isolated districts, so there is quite a large variation in accent, especially between north and south or the coastal towns.  There are some uniform features that should be taken into account when pronouncing dialect words.

Vowels

'feel' > 
'fool' > 
'fail' > 
'file' > 

The pronunciation of moor and poor is a traditional feature of Received Pronunciation but is now associated with some old-fashioned speakers.  It is generally more common in the north of England than in the south.  The words cure, pure, sure may be pronounced with a triphthong .

Consonants
Most consonants are pronounced as they are in other parts of the English speaking world. A few exceptions follow:

 and  have a tendency to be dropped or unreleased in the coda (word- or syllable-finally). This can sometimes occur in the onset as well in words such as finger.

 is realised in various ways throughout the county.  When William Barrow Kendall wrote his Furness Wordbook in 1867, he wrote that  'should never be dropped', suggesting the practice had already become conspicuous.  It seems the elision of both  and  began in the industrial towns and slowly spread out.  In the south, it is now very common.

 in the word final position may be dropped or realised as : woo wool ; pow pole .

 is realised as  following consonants and in word-initial position but is often elided in the coda, unless a following word begins with a vowel: ross ; gimmer ; gimmer hogg .

 is traditionally always pronounced as a voiceless alveolar plosive, although in many places it has been replaced by the glottal stop  now common throughout Britain.

 may be consonantal  as in yam home .

Finally, in some parts of the county, there is a tendency to palatalize the consonant cluster  in word-initial and medial position, thereby rendering it as something more closely approaching [tl].

Stress

Stress is usually placed on the initial syllable:  "acorn" .

Unstressed initial vowels are usually fully realised, whilst those in final syllables are usually reduced to schwa .

Dialect words

General words
 (pronounced eye) yes
 yours
thee / thou you (singular)
yous / thous you (plural)
yat gate
us, es me
our, mine
wherst where is the
djarn doing (as in 'whut yer djarn? - what are you doing?)
divn't don't (as in 'divn't do that, lad')
hoo'doo How are you doing? (strain of 'How do?')
canna can't (as in 'ye canna djur that!' - 'You can't do that!')
cannae can't (more typically Scottish, but used throughout the North) 
djur do
frae from
yon that (when referring to a noun which is visible at the time)
reet Right
(h)arreet All right? (Greeting)
be reet It'll be all right or “it’d be right” when referring to something somewhat negative 
nae No
yonder there (as in 'ower yonder')
owt aught; anything (got owt? - got anything?)
nowt naught; nothing (owt for nowt - something for nothing)
bevvie drink (alcoholic)
eh? what/ isn't it? (that's good eh?)
yan/yaa One

Adjectives
clarty messy, muddy
kaylied intoxicated
kystie squeamish or fussy
la'al small
T'ol old. "T'ol fella" dad, old man
ladgeful embarrassing or unfashionable
slape slippery or smooth as in slape back collie, a border collie with short wiry hair
yon used when indicating a place or object that is usually in sight but far away. abbreviation of yonder.

Adverbs
barrie good
geet/gurt very
gey very
owwer/ovver over/enough ("a'rs garn owwer yonder fer a kip" - I'm going over there for a sleep)
secca/sicca such a
vanna/vanya almost, nearly.

Nouns
attercop spider
bab'e/bairn baby
bait packed meal that is carried to work
bait bag bag in which to carry bait
bar pound (money) (used in Carlisle and occasionally in West Cumberland) 
biddies fleas or head lice or old people "old biddies"
bog toilet (as garn't bog / I'm going to the toilet)
britches trousers (derived from breeches)
byat boat
byuts boots (wuk byuts / work boots)
cack/kack faeces (load a cack)
cheble or chable table
clout/cluwt punch or hit "aas gonna clout thou yan" (I'm going to punch you one); also clout means a cloth
crack/craic gossip "ow marra get some better crack"
cur dog sheepdog - collie
cyak cake
den toilet
doilem idiot
dookers swimming trunks
fratch argument or squabble
fyass face
 ginnel a narrow passage
jinnyspinner a daddy long legs
kecks trousers/pants or underpants
keppards ears
ket/kets sweets
kebbie  a stick
lewer money
lugs ears
mebby maybe
mockin or kack faeces / turd "I need to have a mockin" (see also above, cack)
mowdy or mowdywarp a mole (the animal)
peeve drink (alcoholic)
push iron or push bike bicycle
scran food
scrow a mess
shillies small stones or gravel
skemmy or skem beer
snig small eel
styan stone (styans / stones)
watter water
wuk work, as in: as garn twuk (I'm going to work)
yam home, as in: as garn yam (I'm going home)
yat gate
yhuk hook ("yuk es a wurm on't yhuk" / throw me a worm on the hook)

Verbs
beal cry
bowk retch (as in before vomiting)
bray beat (as in beat up someone)
chess chase
chor steal (Romany origin, cf. Urdu chorna)
chunder vomit
clarten messing about
clout/cluwt hit "al clout ya yan"
deek look (Romany origin, cf Urdu dekhna)
doss Idle or skive. To mess about and avoid work
fettle to fix or mend. ("as i' bad fettle" - I'm not very well)
fistle to fidget
gander look
gan going to somewhere
gar / gaa go
garn / gaan going
git go ("gar on, git yam" / go on, go home)
hoik to pick at or gouge out
hoy throw
jarn/jurn doing
laik play
lait look for
liggin lying down
lob throw
lowp jump
nash run away
radged broken  (radged in the head/mental)
ratch to search for something
scop to throw
scower look at
shag sexual intercourse
skit make fun of
smowk smoking ("As garrn out for a smowk")
sow sexual intercourse
twat hit someone ("I twatted him in the face")
twine to whine or complain
whisht one word command to be quiet
wukn working
yit yet ("ars nut garn yam yit" / i'm not going home yet)
yuk to throw

People
bairden/bairn/barn child
boyo brother/male friend (Carlisle/ West Cumberland)
buwler/bewer ugly girl
cus or cuz friend (from cousin) (East Cumberland)
gammerstang awkward person
mot woman/girl/girlfriend
offcomer a non-native in Cumberland
potter gypsy
gadgey man
charva man/friend (West Cumberland, Carlisle)
marra friend (West Cumberland)
t'ol fella father
t'ol lass mother
t'ol bastard Grandparent
our lass wife/girlfriend
laddo male of unknown name
lasso female of unknown name
jam eater used in Whitehaven to describe someone from Workington, and vice versa.

Farming terms
boose a division in a shuppon
byre cow shed
cop the bank of earth on which a hedge grows
dyke raised bank, often topped with a hedge. Many small roads are flanked by dykes
fodder gang passage for feeding cattle (usually in a shuppon)
kack crap/feces/excrement
ky cow
liggin' kessin when an animal is lying on its back and can't get up
lonnin country lane
stoop a gate post
yakka farmer (There is however in some cases a distinction between yakka and farm-yakker)
yat gate
yow sheep (ewe)

Weather
hossing raining heavily (it's hossing it doon)
glisky when the sky is really bright so you can't see properly
mizzlin misty drizzly rain
syling pouring rain
gey windy 'appen very windy
hoyin it doown teeming it down with rain
yukken it down (it's throwing it down with rain)
whaarm warm(it's gey whaarm / it's very warm)

Places
Barra Barrow
Cockamuth Cockermouth
Jam Land, Whitehaven or Workington
Pereth Penrith
Kendul Kendal
Kezik, Kesik Keswick (It is a silent 'w') Norse 'cheese' and -vik 'place'
Langtoon Longtown
Merrypoort Maryport
Mire-Us or My-Rus Mirehouse
Sanneth Sandwith
Sloth Silloth
Spatry / Speeatry Aspatria
Trepenah, Trappena Torpenhow (Tor, Pen, and How are all words for "hill")
Wukington, Wukinton, Wukintun, Wukiton, Wukitn, Wuki'n, Wucki'n Workington

Phrases
assa marra used by Cumbrians to refer to the Cumbrian dialect
nevva evva av a sin owt like it never ever have I seen anything like it
i ope thou's garna put that in ye pocket I hope you're going to put that in your pocket
ars garn yam I'm going home
av ye? Have you?
en wo? and what?
i urd ye fathas wure in't bad fettle I heard your father was in a bad way or not very well
werst thew of te where are you going
wh'ista*who ar ye? Who are you? (especially used in Appleby) (H is silent in second version) 
whure ye from? Where are you from?
owz't ga'an? How is it going? (how are you)
gaan then provoke fight
wha ya de'yan? What are you doing?
where y'ofta? Where are you off to? (Where are you going?)
ahreet, mattttte. All right, mate? (emphasis the A and T a little)
cought a bug illness
mint/class/necta Excellent (Updated-1 February 2016)
lal lad's in bovver that young man is always in trouble
Tha wants f'ot git thasel 'a pint a 'strangba You really ought to be drinking strongbow
Vaas boddy Who is that (female)
Hoo'ista How are you
Sum reet tidy cluwt oot on tuwn like There are some nice looking girls out
hasta iver deeked a cuddy loup a 5 bar yat have you ever seen a donkey jump a 5 bar gate
out the road not in the way
shy bairns/barns get nowt shy children get nothing; if you don't ask, you will not receive

Cumbrian numbers

The Cumbrian numbers, often called 'sheep counting numerals' because of their (declining) use by shepherds to this very day, show clear signs that they may well have their origins in Cumbric.  The table below shows the variation of the numbers throughout Cumbria, as well as the relevant cognate in Welsh, Cornish and Breton, which are the three geographically closest British languages to Cumbric, for comparison.

NB: when these numerals were used for counting sheep, repeatedly, the shepherd would count to fifteen or twenty and then move a small stone from one of his pockets to the other before beginning again, thus keeping score.  Numbers eleven, twelve etc. would have been 'yandick, tyandick', while sixteen and seventeen would have been 'yan-bumfit, tyan-bumfit' etc.

Although yan is still widely used, wan is starting to creep into some sociolects of the area.

Survey of English Dialects sites
There were several villages in Cumbria that were used during the Survey of English Dialects to minutely detail localised dialects.  At the time, Cumbria did not exist as a unit of local government; there were 12 sites within modern Cumbria spread across four different counties:
Longtown
Abbey Town
Brigham
Threlkeld
Hunsonby
Great Strickland (We1)
Patterdale (We2)
Soulby (We3)
Staveley-in-Kendal (We4)
Coniston (La1)
Cartmel (La2)
Dent (Y5)

Cumbrian poetry
There were several among the well-educated in the 18th century who used dialect in their poetry. One of the earliest was the Rev. Josiah Relph, whose imitations of Theocritan Pastorals self-consciously introduce the demotic for local colour. Although written about 1735, they were not published until after the author's death in A Miscellany of Poems (Wigton, 1747), followed by two further editions in 1797 and 1805. The Rev. Robert Nelson followed him in the same tradition with A choice collection of poems in Cumberland dialect (Sunderland, 1780). Ewan Clark, a contemporary of Nelson's, also wrote a handful of dialect imitations that were included in his Miscellaneous Poems (Whitehaven 1779). Female members of the gentry writing in dialect at this time included Susanna Blamire and her companion Catherine Gilpin.  Miss Blamire had written songs in Scots that were set to music by Joseph Haydn. Her work in Cumbrian dialect was less well known and remained uncollected until the publication of The Muse of Cumberland in 1842. This was followed by Songs and Poems, edited by Sidney Gilpin in 1866, in which Miss Gilpin's work also appeared.

In the 19th century appeared a few poems in dialect in the Miscellaneous Poems of John Stagg (Workington, 1804, second edition the following year). Known as 'the Cumbrian Minstrel', he too wrote in Scots and these poems appeared in the new editions of his poems published from Wigton in 1807 and 1808. What seems to have lifted use of Cumbrian dialect from a passing curiosity to a demonstration of regional pride in the hands of labouring class poets was the vogue of Robert Burns, among whose disciples the calico worker Robert Anderson counted himself. His Ballads in the Cumberland Dialect were published from Carlisle in 1805 and were reprinted in several different formats over the following decades. Some of these publications also incorporated the work of his precursors and a few other contemporaries, such as Ewan Clark and Mark Lonsdale. One such collection was Ballads in the Cumberland dialect, chiefly by R. Anderson (1808, second edition 1815, Wigton), and a third from Carlisle in 1823.

A more ambitious anthology of dialect verse, Dialogues, poems, songs, and ballads, by various writers, in the Westmoreland and Cumberland dialects, followed from London in 1839. This contained work by all the poets mentioned already, with the addition of some songs by John Rayson that were later to be included in his Miscellaneous Poems and Ballads (London, 1858). Another anthology of regional writing, Sidney Gilpin's The Songs and Ballads of Cumberland (London, 1866), collects together work in both standard English and dialect by all the poets mentioned so far, as well as Border Ballads, poems by William Wordsworth and family, and other verse of regional interest. Some later poets include John Sewart (Rhymes in the Westmoreland Dialect, Settle, 1869) and Gwordie Greenup (the pseudonym of Stanley Martin), who published short collections in prose and verse during the 1860s and 1870s. A more recent anthology, Oor mak o' toak: an anthology of Lakeland dialect poems, 1747-1946, was published from Carlisle in 1946 by the Lakeland Dialect Society.

Barrovian Dialect

Barrow-in-Furness is unique within Cumbria and the local dialect tends to be more Lancashire orientated. Like Liverpool this is down to the large numbers of settlers from various regions (including predominantly Scotland, elsewhere in England and Ireland amongst other locations). In general the Barrovian dialect tends to drop certain letters (including h and t) for example holiday would be pronounced as  'oliday, and with the drop of the h there is more emphasis on the letter o. The indefinite article used would be 'an'. 'A hospital' becomes an 'ospital. Another example is with the letter t where twenty is often pronounced twen'y (again an emphasis on the n could occur).

See also 
Cumbria
Cumbric language
Dialect
Etymology of Cumbrian place names
Northumbrian dialect

References

Bibliography

External links
 Sounds Familiar? — Listen to examples of regional accents and dialects from across the UK on the British Library's 'Sounds Familiar' website
 Listen to Pronunciation www.dokeswick.com
 Lakeland Dialect Society
 The GonMad Cumbrian Dictionary (online since 1997) 
 Cumbrian Dictionary
 The BabelSheep online English to Cumbrian translator
 The Routes of English B.B.C. radio programme on the Cumbrian dialect, sound files, 2000 
 Low Nest Farm's webpage with many useful references

Books:
 Ballads in the Cumberland Dialect, by R. Anderson, with Notes and a Glossary; and an Essay on the Manners and Customs of the Cumberland Peasantry, by Thomas Sanderson. 1828: Google
 Westmoreland and Cumberland Dialects. Dialogues, Poems, Songs, and Ballads, by various Writers, in the Westmoreland and Cumberland Dialects, now first collected: with a copious Glossary of Words peculiar to those Counties. London, 1839: Google (Google)
 The Songs and Ballads of Cumberland, to which are added Dialect and other Poems; with biographical Sketches, Notes, and Glossary. Edited by Sidney Gilpin. 1866: Google
 A Bibliography of the Dialect Literature of Cumberland and Westmorland, and Lancashire North-of-the-Sands. By Archibald Sparke., Kendal, 1907: Internet Archive

Culture in Cumbria
British English
Dialects by location
Dialects of English